George Druxman (December 4, 1929 – July 2, 1999) was a Canadian football player who played for the Winnipeg Blue Bombers. He won the Grey Cup with Winnipeg in 1958, 1959, 1961 and 1962. He played college football at the University of Portland. After his football career he was a hotelier. Druxman died in 1999.

References

1929 births
1999 deaths
Canadian players of American football
Winnipeg Blue Bombers players
Portland Pilots football players
Canadian football people from Winnipeg
Players of Canadian football from Manitoba